The Telescopes is the second studio album by English alternative rock band The Telescopes, released in 1992 on Creation Records. It has been referred to by the title High'r 'n' High'r (or fully Higher and Higher), due to said text appearing on the original album cover. The album was reissued in 2004 by Rev-Ola Records with the title # Untitled Second and featuring the bonus tracks "dnaanb" and "Tornado".

Track listing

References 

1992 albums
The Telescopes albums
Creation Records albums